The 11th Hussar Regiment (11e régiment de hussards) was a hussar regiment in the French Army.

History

The Revolutionary Wars
It was raised on 28 July 1793 from personnel of the 24th Mounted Chasseurs Regiment. Also added were two volunteer regiments, the Germanic Legion, and the second squadron of the Hussards de la Liberté. Jacques-Philippe Avice was the regiment's chef de brigade.

The regiment fought in the War of the First Coalition, participating in the Second Battle of Wissembourg, the War of the Pyrenees, the War in the Vendée, the Battle of Friedberg, the Siege of Kehl and the Italian Campaigns of the War of the Second Coalition.

An early member of the regiment was Pierre David de Colbert-Chabanais.

The Napoleonic Wars
On 24 September 1803 it was renamed the 29th Dragoon Regiment.

A new 11th Hussars was set up on 18 August 1810 by splitting off personnel from the 2nd Dutch Hussars Regiment (régiment des hussards hollandais) within the French Army.

The new unit participated in the Russian Campaign in 1812 and the Battle of Leipzig in 1813.

It was disbanded in 1814 upon the Bourbon Restoration.

Renewal
A third 11th Hussar Regiment was set up at Sidi Bel Abbès in 1873, formed of one squadron from the 1st Chasseurs and other squadrons from the 1st, 3rd and 8th Hussars.

This regiment was disbanded in 1919, after serving in the First World War.

Uniform
Hackle: grey 
Cord: white 
Collar: grey 
Dolman: green 
Pelisse: green 
Side stripe: grey 
Braid: white 
Breeches: grey

Bibliography

Cavalry regiments of France
Regiments of the French First Republic
Regiments of the First French Empire
Regiments of France in the French Revolutionary Wars
20th-century regiments of France
Military units and formations established in 1793
Military units and formations disestablished in 1803
Military units and formations established in 1810
Military units and formations disestablished in 1814
Military units and formations established in 1873
Military units and formations disestablished in 1919
1793 establishments in France